Williams Lake is the name of several places:

Canada

Populated places
 Williams Lake, British Columbia, a city in Canada

Lakes
 Williams Lake (British Columbia), namesake of the city
 Williams Lake (Cumberland), Cumberland County, Nova Scotia
 Williams Lake (Goffs), in Goffs, Nova Scotia
 Williams Lake (Halifax)
 Williams Lake (Jeddore), in Jeddore, Nova Scotia
 Williams Lake (Ontario), located in the Town of Chatsworth, Grey County, Ontario, 23 kilometres south of Owen Sound

Other
 Williams Lake Indian Reserve, British Columbia
 Williams Lake (Census Agglomeration), British Columbia - A census agglomeration

United States

Populated Places
 Williams Lake Resort, community in Lemhi County, Idaho

Lakes
Williams Lake, Faulkner County, Arkansas
Williams Lake, Logan County, Arkansas
Williams Lake, Miller County, Arkansas
 Williams Lake (Colorado), Pitkin County, Colorado
 Williams Lake, Lemhi County, Idaho
 Williams Lake (Indiana), Noble County, Indiana
 Williams Lake (Iowa), Linn County, Iowa
 Williams Lake (Louisiana), Caddo Parish, Louisiana
Williams Lake (Michigan)
 Williams Lake (Nebraska), Grant County, Nebraska
 Williams Lake (New Mexico), Taos County, New Mexico
 Williams Lake (Ohio), Miami County, Ohio
 Williams Lake (Oregon), Clackamas County, Oregon
 Williams Lake (Tennessee), Shelby County, Tennessee

See also
 Lake Williams (North Dakota), a lake in Kidder County, North Dakota